Philip William Skinner Miles (1816 – 1 October 1881), sometimes spelled Skynner Miles, was a British Conservative politician.

He was the son of  Member of Parliament (MP) Philip John Miles and Clarissa née Peach.

Miles was elected a Conservative MP for Bristol at the 1837 general election and held the seat until 1852 when he did not seek re-election.

Miles was appointed High Sheriff of Gloucestershire for 1863. He was Chairman of the Port and Pier Railway Company.

Family life
In 1846 Miles married Pamela Adelaide Napier (1823-1910), daughter of Lieutenant-General Sir William Francis Patrick Napier and Caroline Amelia Fox. They had one child, Philip Napier Miles (1865–1935). Miles died on 1 October 1881 at Kings Weston House aged 65.

References

External links
 

UK MPs 1837–1841
UK MPs 1841–1847
UK MPs 1847–1852
Conservative Party (UK) MPs for English constituencies
1816 births
1881 deaths
High Sheriffs of Gloucestershire
People from Clifton, Bristol